A bronze sculpture depicting Meriwether Lewis, William Clark, and Seaman by Stanley Wanlass, sometimes called End of the Trail, is installed in Seaside, Oregon, United States. The memorial was installed in 1990 and marks the end of the Lewis and Clark Trail. According to the National Park Service, the "End of the Trail Lewis and Clark Commemorative Statue" honors the Corps of Discovery and Lewis and Clark Expedition.

References

External links

 

1990 establishments in Oregon
1990 sculptures
Bronze sculptures in Oregon
Buildings and structures in Clatsop County, Oregon
Cultural depictions of Meriwether Lewis and William Clark
Lewis and Clark Expedition
Monuments and memorials in Oregon
Monuments and memorials to explorers
Outdoor sculptures in Oregon
Sculptures of dogs in the United States
Sculptures of men in Oregon
Seaside, Oregon
Statues in Oregon